Zu Lijun (born 26 November 1989) is a Chinese competitive swimmer who specialises in long-distance open water events.

Career
In June 2016, Zu won the Olympic qualifier race in Setúbal, Portugal, which qualified him for the Olympic marathon.

Zu finished in 4th place in the 10 km open water marathon at the 2016 Summer Olympics in Rio de Janeiro, 2.2 seconds behind gold medalist Ferry Weertman. He recorded the same time as bronze medalist Marc-Antoine Olivier of France.

References

1989 births
Living people
Chinese male freestyle swimmers
Chinese male long-distance swimmers
Olympic swimmers of China
Swimmers at the 2016 Summer Olympics
Swimmers from Shandong
Sportspeople from Zibo

Nanjing Sport Institute alumni
21st-century Chinese people